Hypocalymma uncinatum is a member of the family Myrtaceae endemic to Western Australia.

It blooms between July to September producing white flowers.

It is found among granite outcrops and hills in the Wheatbelt region of Western Australia in an area between Merredin and Kondinin where it grows in sandy or loamy soils with lateritic gravel.

References

uncinatum
Endemic flora of Western Australia
Rosids of Western Australia
Plants described in 2002
Taxa named by Gregory John Keighery
Taxa named by Arne Strid